Rustai-ye Tall Shiraz (also Romanized as Rūstāī-ye Tall Shīrāz) is a village in Jahadabad Rural District, in the Central District of Anbarabad County, Kerman Province, Iran. At the 2006 census, its population was 618, in 128 families.

References 

Populated places in Anbarabad County